Martensia fragilis is a species of red algae.

References

Species described in 1854
Delesseriaceae